The Uzbek Figure Skating Championships are a figure skating competition held annually to crown the national champions of Uzbekistan.

Medalists

Men

Ladies

Pairs

Ice dancing

References

Figure skating national championships
Figure skating in Uzbekistan